Bluebird Creek is a stream in the U.S. state of Iowa. It is a tributary of the Little Sioux River.

The name of Bluebird Creek was submitted by local second graders as the winning entry in a naming contest.

See also
List of rivers of Iowa

References

Rivers of Buena Vista County, Iowa
Rivers of Clay County, Iowa
Rivers of Iowa